Joseph W. Lechleider (22 February 1933, Brooklyn – 18 April 2015) was the inventor at the Bell Telephone Company of the DSL (digital subscriber line) technology.

Early life
Lechleider attended Brooklyn Technical High School before earning his undergraduate degree from Cooper Union and a Ph.D. from the Polytechnic Institute of Brooklyn (now part of the New York University Tandon School of Engineering.

References 

1933 births
2015 deaths
People from Brooklyn
American inventors
History of the Internet
Engineers from New York City
Brooklyn Technical High School alumni
Polytechnic Institute of New York University alumni
Cooper Union alumni